The Journal of Interpretation Research is a biannual peer-reviewed academic journal covering research and discourse in the field of environmental interpretation, heritage interpretation,  and environmental education. It is published by the National Association for Interpretation. The editors-in-chief are Robert B. Powell (Clemson University, Clemson, SC, United States) and Marc J. Stern (Virginia Tech, Blacksburg, VA, United States.

External links 
 

Environmental education
History journals
Cultural heritage
Biannual journals
Academic journals published by learned and professional societies
Delayed open access journals
Publications established in 1996
Education journals
Environmental humanities journals
Heritage interpretation
Environmental social science journals